Isodontia apicalis is a species of thread-waisted wasp in the family Sphecidae from North and Central America.

References

Sphecidae
Articles created by Qbugbot
Insects described in 1856